This list of bridges in China includes notable bridges. China has a long history in bridge construction. The oldest bridge still in existence in China is the Anji Bridge, constructed during the years between 595 and 605.

During the infrastructure boom of the past two decades, bridge-building has proceeded at a rapid pace on a vast scale. Prior to the completion of the Wuhan Yangtze River Bridge in 1957, there were no bridges across the Yangtze River, China's longest, from Yibin to Shanghai, and all overland roads and railways crossing this 2,884 km (1,792 mi.) stretch of the river had to be ferried. There were only seven such bridges in 1992, but that number reached 73 by the end of 2012, including eight new openings in that year alone.

China has been pushing the boundaries of bridge construction with many record breaking bridges, including: 
 The Yangsigang Yangtze River Bridge in Wuhan, the third-longest suspension bridge span .
 The Hutong Yangtze River Bridge in Jiangsu province, the second-longest cable-stayed span.
 The Duge Bridge, the highest bridge in the world.
 The , the longest arch bridge span.

Historical and architectural interest bridges

Major road and railway bridges 
This table presents the structures with spans greater than 1000 meters (non-exhaustive list).

List of bridges by province 
Dedicated lists already exist for the following provinces : Chongqing, Fujian, Guangdong, Guizhou, Hubei, Jiangsu, Sichuan, Zhejiang, Hong Kong and Taiwan.

Anhui
Anqing Bridge
Anqing Railway Bridge
Ma'anshan Yangtze River Bridge
Taipinghu Bridge
Tongling Bridge
Wuhu Yangtze River Bridge

Beijing
Baliqiao
Beijing Grand Bridge
Gao Liangqiao
Jade Belt Bridge
Marco Polo Bridge
Sanyuan Bridge
Shifeng Bridge

Gansu
Zhongshan Bridge

Guangxi
Chengyang Bridge
Hongguang Bridge
Ling-Tie Bridge
Liujing Yujiang Bridge
Sanan Yongjiang Bridge
Wenhui Bridge
Yonghe Bridge (Nanning)
Yongjiang Bridge
Yongjiang Railway Bridge under construction

Hainan
Dinghai Bridge, an arch bridge of the Nandu River built in 2017
Haikou Century Bridge, a cable-stayed bridge in Haikou city, crossing the mouth of the Haidian River, it links the main part of Haikou city to Haidian Island
Haikou New East Bridge, an arch bridge over the Nandu River connecting Xinbu Island at the west to Dongying Town and the rest of the province at the east
Nandu River Iron Bridge, a partially collapsed, steel truss bridge over the Nandu River
Qinglan Bridge is a cable-stayed bridge in Wenchang. It is considered the most earthquake-resistant bridge in China being able to handle one at a magnitude of 8.5 on the Richter scale.
Puqian Bridge, an under-construction bridge in the northeast part of Hainan, over the entrance to Dongzhai Harbor
Qiongzhou Bridge, crossing the Nandu River, it serves as the main bridge from Haikou city to Haikou Meilan International Airport

Hebei
Anji Bridge

Heilongjiang
Yangmingtan Bridge

Henan
Xuguo Bridge

Hunan
Aizhai Bridge
Akaishi Bridge under construction
Dongting Lake Bridge
Lianxiang Bridge
Lishui River Bridge
Jingyue Bridge
Maocaojie Bridge
Sanchaji Bridge
Wangchui Bridge
Wangcun Bridge
Zhangjiajie Glass Bridge
Lucky Knot Bridge

Inner Mongolia
Baotou Yellow River Bridge

Jiangxi
Dongjin Bridge
Jiujiang Bridge
Jiujiang Fuyin Expressway Bridge
Poyang Lake Bridge
Shengmi Bridge

Jilin
Changbai–Hyesan International Bridge
Ji'an Yalu River Border Railway Bridge
Lanqi Bridge
Linjiang Yalu River Bridge
Tumen Border Bridge
Tumen River Bridge

Liaoning
Fumin Bridge
Liaohe Bridge
Moon Island Bridge
New Yalu River Bridge
Sino–Korean Friendship Bridge

Ningxia
Taole Yellow River Expressway Bridge

Qinghai
Tuotuo River Bridge

Shaanxi
Luohe River Bridge
Weinan Weihe Grand Bridge

Shandong
Binzhou Yellow River Bridge
Luokou Yellow River Railway Bridge
Jiaozhou Bay Bridge
Jinan Third Bridge
Jinan Yellow River Bridge
Weiliu Bridge

Shanghai
Chonghai Bridge
Chongqi Bridge
Donghai Bridge
Lupu Bridge
Minpu Bridge
Nanpu Bridge
Shanghai Yangtze River Bridge
Waibaidu Bridge
Xupu Bridge
Yangpu Bridge

Shanxi
Xianshen River Bridge

Tianjin
Dagu Bridge
Tianjin Eye
Yonghe Bridge (Tianjin)

Tibet
Chushul Chakzam
Dazi Bridge
Jiaolongba Bridge
Sino-Nepal Friendship Bridge
Tongmai Bridge

Xinjiang
Guozigoui Bridge

Yunnan
Duge Bridge
Honghe Bridge
Lancang River Railway Bridge under construction
Liupanshui Bridge
Longjiang Bridge under construction
Nanpanjiang Bridge
Puli Bridge
Qiubei Nanpanjiang River Bridge under construction
Jin'an Bridge under construction

Macau
Ponte de Amizade

Notes and references 
 Notes

 

 Others references

See also 

 Architecture of the Song dynasty
 Bridges and tunnels across the Yangtze River
 Transport in China
 China National Highways
 Expressways of China
 Rail transport in China
 Geography of China
 :zh:天津海河桥梁列表  - List of bridges over the Haihe in Tianjin

External links

Further reading 
 
 
 
 
 